Leopard orchid may refer to several genera and species of orchid:

Ansellia
Diuris pardina
Dendrobium gracilicaule